The Ignite Channel is an independent film studio in Woodside, California, which produces and distributes films about arts, culture, and innovation. The studio has produced and co-produced a number of award-winning documentaries, including Twinsters and Poached (2015). In 2015, Ignite acquired the distribution rights in North America of the movie Brand: A Second Coming by Ondi Timoner.

The studio is owned by the tech entrepreneur Steve Brown.

Filmography

References

External links
 
 
 

2014 establishments in the United States
Companies based in San Mateo, California
Mass media companies established in 2014
Film production companies of the United States
American film studios
Woodside, California